The following is a partial list of the "D" codes for Medical Subject Headings (MeSH), as defined by the United States National Library of Medicine (NLM).

This list covers nuclear proteins. For other protein-related codes, see List of MeSH codes (D12.776).

Codes before these are found at List of MeSH codes (D12.776.641). Codes following these are found at List of MeSH codes (D12.776) § MeSH D12.776.664. For other MeSH codes, see List of MeSH codes.

The source for this content is the set of 2006 MeSH Trees from the NLM.

– nuclear proteins

– antennapedia homeodomain protein

– brca1 protein

– brca2 protein

– ccaat-enhancer-binding proteins

– ccaat-binding factor

– ccaat-enhancer-binding protein-alpha

– ccaat-enhancer-binding protein-beta

– ccaat-enhancer-binding protein-delta

– transcription factor chop

– y-box-binding protein 1

– chromosomal proteins, non-histone

– centromere protein b

– high mobility group proteins
 – hmgn proteins
 – hmgn1 protein
 – hmgn2 protein
 – hmga proteins
 – hmga1a protein
 – hmga1b protein
 – hmga1c protein
 – hmga2 protein
 – hmgb proteins
 – hmgb1 protein
 – hmgb2 protein
 – hmgb3 protein
 – sex-determining region y protein
 – tcf transcription factors
 – lymphoid enhancer-binding factor 1
 – t cell transcription factor 1

– methyl-cpg-binding protein 2

– telomere-binding proteins
 – heterogeneous-nuclear ribonucleoprotein group a-b
 – telomeric repeat binding protein 1
 – telomeric repeat binding protein 2

– fanconi anemia complementation group a protein

– fanconi anemia complementation group d2 protein

– fanconi anemia complementation group e protein

– fanconi anemia complementation group f protein

– hepatocyte nuclear factors

– hepatocyte nuclear factor 1
 – hepatocyte nuclear factor 1-alpha
 – hepatocyte nuclear factor 1-beta

– hepatocyte nuclear factor 3-alpha

– hepatocyte nuclear factor 3-beta

– hepatocyte nuclear factor 3-gamma

– hepatocyte nuclear factor 4

– hepatocyte nuclear factor 6

– histones

– immunoglobulin j recombination signal sequence-binding protein

– karyopherins

– alpha karyopherins

– beta karyopherins

– nf-kappa b

– nf-kappa b p50 subunit

– nf-kappa b p52 subunit

– transcription factor rela

– transcription factor relb

– antigens, nuclear

– ki-67 antigen

– nuclear matrix-associated proteins

– heterogeneous-nuclear ribonucleoprotein u

– lamins
 – lamin type a
 – lamin type b

– oncogene protein p55(v-myc)

– proliferating cell nuclear antigen

– protamines

– clupeine

– salmine

– proto-oncogene proteins c-fos

– proto-oncogene proteins c-jun

– proto-oncogene proteins c-mdm2

– proto-oncogene proteins c-myc

– proto-oncogene proteins c-rel

– ran gtp-binding protein

– retinoblastoma-like protein p107

– retinoblastoma-like protein p130

– retinoblastoma protein

– silent information regulator proteins, saccharomyces cerevisiae

– tumor suppressor protein p53

The list continues at List of MeSH codes (D12.776) § MeSH D12.776.664.

D12.776.660